Franz Wohlfahrt (7 April 1833 – 14 March 1884) was a German violin teacher and composer based in Leipzig.

Wohlfahrt was born and died in Leipzig, where his father, Heinrich Wohlfahrt, was a piano teacher. He wrote a series of etudes, 60 Studies for Violin, Op. 45, which are often among the first ones studied by beginning violinists and violists. He was a student of Ferdinand David.

References

External links

1833 births
1884 deaths
19th-century classical composers
19th-century classical violinists
19th-century German composers
19th-century German male musicians
German classical violinists
German male classical composers
German male violinists
German Romantic composers
Male classical violinists
Violin pedagogues